Rendez-vous en terre inconnue (formerly En terre inconnue) is a French television program broadcast first on France 5 and then on the France 2 network. It was hosted by Frédéric Lopez (who is also the originator of the concept) for years and is now hosted by Raphaël de Casabianca, and involves taking a French celebrity to an unknown destination to live with an ethnic minority for two weeks.

The show aims to provide the viewer with a new outlook on a foreign group, whose culture and traditions are being threatened by the  modern world.

Series

References

2000s French television series
2010s French television series
2004 French television series debuts